Mind Rover is a video game for PC, developed by CogniToy.

Gameplay 
The game, which can be thought of as a successor to the Learning Company's Robot Odyssey, revolves around three activities:
 Assemble virtual robots from a library of stock parts.
 Programming robots using a special graphical interface (referred to in the game as "wiring") with a paradigm more based on multicomponent circuitry construction than on traditional programming.
 Participate in events such as robot battles and racing games with newly programmed robot.

Availability 
The game was developed for Microsoft Windows. Add-ons were available to control Lego Mindstorms robots.

The game was ported to Linux by Loki Software and Linux Game Publishing and to the Mac by MacPlay.

Development
The game had a budget of $500,000. In October 2000, CogniToy signed a contract with Tri Synergy to distribute the game.

Reception

The game received mostly positive reviews. Carla Harker reviewed the PC version of the game for Next Generation, rating it five stars out of five, and stated that "A truly amazing title for anyone looking for something unique and challenging."

References

External links 
BattleSpot
Mindrover Home

2000 video games
Linux games
Windows games
Classic Mac OS games
Programming games
Robotics simulation software
Strategy video games
Loki Entertainment games
Tank simulation video games
Video games developed in the United States
Video games set in outer space
Linux Game Publishing games